Radoslav Katičić (3 July 1930 – 10 August 2019) was a Croatian linguist, classical philologist, Indo-Europeanist, Slavist and Indologist, one of the most prominent Croatian scholars in the humanities.

Biography
Radoslav Katičić was born on 3 July 1930 in Zagreb, Croatia which was part of Kingdom of Yugoslavia at the time. He attended primary school, and in 1949 he graduated at the classical gymnasium in his home town.

At the Faculty of Humanities and Social Sciences, University of Zagreb, he received a degree in Classical Philology in 1954. The same year he started working as a part-time librarian at the Seminar for Classical Philology at the same faculty. His first scientific works were on the subjects of Ancient Greek philology and Byzantine studies.

As a stipendist of the Greek government he visited Athens in 1956-57, and in 1958 he was elected as an assistant at the Department for Comparative Indo-European Grammar at the Faculty of Humanities and Social Sciences in Zagreb.

In 1959 he received his Ph.D. with the thesis Pitanje jedinstva indoeuropske glagolske fleksije ('The question of unity of Indo-European verbal flexion'). During the period of 1960-61 he was a stipendist of the Alexander von Humboldt Foundation in Tübingen. After the return to his main university, he became a docent on Indo-European and general linguistics. Soon after, he served as a head of the newly formed Department for General Linguistics and Oriental Studies. In 1966 he became associate, and in 1973 full professor. Beside general and Indo-European linguistics, he also taught Old Iranian and Old Indic philology.

In 1977 he became full professor of Slavic philology at the University of Vienna, Austria.

In 1973 he was selected as an extraordinary member of the Yugoslav Academy of Sciences and Arts (now Croatian Academy of Sciences and Arts), and in 1986 he became a full member. In 1981 he became a corresponding member of the Austrian Academy of Sciences, in 1989 becoming a full member, and since 1989 serving as a head of the renowned Balkan commission. In 1984 he became a member of the Academy of Sciences and Arts of Bosnia and Herzegovina, in 1987 member of the Norwegian Academy of Science and Letters, and in 1991 member of the Academia Europaea. In 2011 he became a member of  Accademia Nazionale dei Lincei and in 2012 of Academy of Sciences and Arts of Kosovo. In 1989 he received an honorary doctorate from the University of Osijek, and in 1999 an honorary degree and professorship at the Eötvös Loránd University in Budapest.

In 2005 he became the head of Council for Standard Croatian Language Norm. He served in that role until council's abolition in 2012.

Work
In the past twenty years he chiefly researched on the topic of history of Croatian grammar, philology, early Croatian Middle Ages, engaging in extensive synthetic research of the key periods of history of Croatian literature and the reconstruction of Proto-Slavic ceremonial texts, sacral poetry of mythological content, and legislative literature. Some aspects of his work meet criticism, primarily his puristic approach to the linguistic terminology, the primordialist view of nations, and subjectivity in articles on language policy. Besides, his syntactic description has been judged negatively by other Croatian syntacticians.

Katičić's scholarly contributions which consists of more than 150 titles (books and papers) can be divided in five fields:
 General linguistics and Paleo-Balkan studies (mainly based on transformational grammar approach), consisting of works written in English:
 A Contribution to the General Theory of Comparative Linguistics (the Hague-Paris, 1970)
 The Ancient Languages of the Balkans, 1-2 (the Hague-Paris, 1976)
 Linguistic-stylistic works on aspects and history of various European (Ancient Greek, Byzantine) and non-European literatures:
 Stara indijska književnost/Old Indian literature (Zagreb, 1973)
 Numerous studies on Croatian language history, from the inception of the Croats in the 7th century onwards. Katičić has charted the meanderings in the continuity of Croatian language and literature, from the earliest stone inscriptions and Glagolitic medieval literature in the Croatian recension of Church Slavonic to the works of Renaissance writers such as Marin Držić and Marko Marulić, who wrote in a Croatian vernacular. He also explored language standardization and wrote a syntactic description of modern Croatian (Sintaksa hrvatskoga književnoga jezika/Syntax of Standard Croatian, Zagreb, 1986), based on texts by contemporary authors such as Miroslav Krleža and Tin Ujević.
 Synthetic works that explore the beginnings of Croatian civilization in a multidisciplinary fashion based on philology, archeology, culturology, paleography and textual analysis:
 Uz početke hrvatskih početaka/Roots of Croatian roots (Split 1993)
 Litterarium studia (Vienna-Zagreb, 1999, in German and Croatian)
 Reconstruction of Proto-Slavic sacral poetry and Slavic pre-Christian faith:
 Božanski boj: Tragovima svetih pjesama naše pretkršćanske starine (Zagreb, 2008)
 Zeleni lug: Tragovima svetih pjesama naše pretkršćanske starine (Zagreb, 2010)
 Gazdarica na vratima: Tragovima svetih pjesama naše pretkršćanske starine (Zagreb, 2011)
 Vilinska vrata: I dalje tragovima svetih pjesama naše pretkršćanske starine (Zagreb, 2014)
 Naša stara vjera: Tragovima svetih pjesama naše pretkršćanske starine (Zagreb, 2017)

References

External links
Academician Katičić's homepage
Katičić's biography, at the Matica hrvatska's website

1930 births
2019 deaths
Linguists from Croatia
20th-century Croatian historians
Members of the Croatian Academy of Sciences and Arts
Faculty of Humanities and Social Sciences, University of Zagreb alumni
Scientists from Zagreb
Academic staff of the University of Vienna
Classical philologists
Members of the Norwegian Academy of Science and Letters
Members of the Academy of Sciences and Arts of Kosovo